The 1902 Tempe Normal Owls football team was an American football team that represented Tempe Normal School (later renamed Arizona State University) as an independent during the 1902 college football season. In their fourth season under head coach Frederick M. Irish, the Owls compiled a 2–1 record, shut out two opponents, and outscored their opponents by a combined total of 73 to 12. The team won games against the Phoenix High School (39–0) and the Phoenix Indians (34–0) and lost in the second Arizona–Arizona State football rivalry game (0–12).

Schedule

References

Tempe Normal
Arizona State Sun Devils football seasons
Tempe Normal Owls football